Thaneroclerus is a genus of checkered beetles in the family Thanerocleridae.

European Species
 Thaneroclerus buquet (Lefebvre, 1835)

References

Further reading

 

Thanerocleridae
Articles created by Qbugbot